HMS Audacious is the fourth  nuclear-powered fleet submarine of the Royal Navy. Several previous vessels of the Royal Navy have borne the name. She was formally named on 16 December 2016 and was launched on 28 April 2017.  Audacious was stated to be handed over in January 2021. A parliamentary written answer stated that Audacious was commissioned on 3 April 2020, but her public ceremonial commissioning took place on 23 September 2021.

Design

Propulsion
Audaciouss nuclear reactor will not need to be refuelled during the boat's 25-year service. The submarine can purify water and air, and will be able to circumnavigate the planet without surfacing. However, she carries three months' supply of food for 98 officers and ratings.

Weapons
Audacious has provision for up-to 38 weapons in six  torpedo tubes.

History
Long lead items for her construction were ordered on 28 August 2006, although the actual order was not placed until 21 May 2007. Launch was expected in the fourth quarter of 2016, and the submarine was due to leave the yard in 2017.  She was eventually formally named on 16 December 2016, and floated out on 28 April 2017, and was due to leave in 2018 for sea trials.  The original budget was £1.279b but by 2015 this had risen to £1.492b.

The submarine and its crew have formally forged links with the City of Leeds (which had previously had an association with ) by meeting the people at Elland Road in the city and marching in the Armistice Day parade in November 2016.

Audacious completed her first dive at Devonshire Dock over two days in January 2018. She eventually sailed from Barrow on 4 April 2020, and commenced sea trials on 6 April 2020. A parliamentary written answer stated that Audacious was commissioned on 3 April 2020, but she was ceremonially commissioned on 23 September 2021.

In the first half of 2022, the submarine operated in tandem with NATO forces in the eastern Mediterranean. She was again reported in the eastern Mediterranean in early 2023, including stopping for a rest and maintenance period in Limassol Cyprus.

References

External links 

 
Astute Class (naval-technology.com)

 

Astute-class submarines
2017 ships
Ships built in Barrow-in-Furness